Gregory Thomas Springer (born February 13, 1961 in Woodland Hills, California) is an American former competitive rower and Olympic silver medalist.

Career

At the 1984 Summer Olympics, Springer finished in 2nd place in the men's coxed fours competition with Edward Ives, Thomas Kiefer, Michael Bach, and John Stillings.  At the 1992 Summer Olympics, he finished in 9th place in the men's double sculls.

References

 

1961 births
Living people
American male rowers
Rowers at the 1984 Summer Olympics
Rowers at the 1992 Summer Olympics
Olympic silver medalists for the United States in rowing
Medalists at the 1984 Summer Olympics
Pan American Games medalists in rowing
Pan American Games gold medalists for the United States
Rowers at the 1983 Pan American Games
Medalists at the 1983 Pan American Games